To Joy is a 1950 Swedish film directed and written by Ingmar Bergman about a young married couple who play together in a Swedish orchestra.

Plot
Stig and Marta are two violinists playing in the orchestra directed by Sönderby. They wed, but Stig's ambition is overwhelming and his ego, oversized. The difficulties the couple encounters in its day-to-day life, as well as Stig's inability to accept the career of a soloist embitter the man. He starts seeing Mikael Bro, an old swinger friend, and his wife Nelly, who form a sulfurous couple.

Cast
 Maj-Britt Nilsson as Marta Olsson
 Stig Olin as Stig Eriksson
 Birger Malmsten as Marcel
 John Ekman as Mikael Bro
 Margit Carlqvist as Nelly Bro
 Victor Sjöström as Sönderby

References

External links

1950 films
1950 drama films
1950s Swedish-language films
Swedish black-and-white films
Films directed by Ingmar Bergman
Films with screenplays by Ingmar Bergman
Films about violins and violinists
Swedish drama films
1950s Swedish films